Daniel J. Shipp, is an American educator and the tenth president of Pittsburg State University. Prior to his appointment at Pittsburg State in 2022, Shipp served in multiple roles between the University of Nebraska Medical Center and University of Nebraska Omaha for the previous ten years.

Biography

Education 
Shipp attended the University of Nebraska–Lincoln, where he graduated with a bachelor of arts in education. Shipp then went on to receive his master of arts in education degree in 1993 from the University of Nebraska Omaha and his educational doctorate from the University of the Pacific.

Early career 
After graduating with his master's in 1993, Shipp served three years as the campus recreation services assistant director for UNO, before serving ten years at the University of Missouri as its senior associate director for recreation services from 1996 to 2006. While at Missouri, Shipp helped raise $50 million for a new recreation complex. In 2006, Shipp left Missouri for the University of the Pacific, where he served as associate vice chancellor for student life. There was the force behind a $40 million university center.

University of Nebraska system 
In 2012, Shipp returned to UNO to serve as vice chancellor of student affairs. He served in that capacity for eight years where he helped transform student success at the university by expanding enrollment numbers and graduation rates, as well as fundraising $200 million plus for campus improvements. Shipp also was the lead executive at the university to guide the campus through the COVID-19 pandemic. On November 1, 2021, Shipp was named vice chancellor for strategic initiatives at the University of Nebraska Medical Center and executive vice president and provost of the University of Nebraska System.

Pittsburg State University 
On April 8, 2022, the Kansas Board of Regents announced Shipp as the 10th president of Pittsburg State University. He began on June 6, 2022.

References

External links 
 Pittsburg State profile

Presidents of Pittsburg State University
University of Nebraska–Lincoln alumni
University of Nebraska Omaha alumni
University of the Pacific (United States) alumni
Educators from Kansas
Living people
Year of birth missing (living people)